Dimitrie Drăghicescu (or Dumitru Drăghicescu) (1875–1945) was a Romanian politician, sociologist, diplomat and writer.

Dimitrie Drăghicescu was born on 4 May 1875 in the village of Zăvoieni, Vâlcea County, Romania. After finishing grammar school in his native village, he attended Carol I High School in Craiova and thereafter the Law Faculty of Bucharest University. In 1901 he left for Paris where he studied at the Collège de France where he studied with Emile Durkheim, Gabriel de Tarde, Henri Bergson, Theodule Armand Ribot. He also attended the lectures organized by the Académie des Sciences Morales et Politiques.

On 17 May 1904 he obtained his doctor's degree in Sociology. In 1905 he was appointed associate professor of Sociology at the University of Bucharest.

During World War I, from 1916 to 1918 he lived in France where he was active in promoting the ideas of a national Romanian state. On 9–12 April 1918 he attended the "Congress of Nationalities" in Rome with Nicolae Lupu and Simion Mândrescu,  as members of the group supporting the right of Romanians to a state within their national ethnic borders and demanding the recognition of Romania as a cobelligerent country.

From 1934 to 1936 he was minister plenipotentiary in Mexico.

He is said to have committed suicide  on 14 September 1945. However, some Romanians believe he was murdered by some members of the Communist Party.

Works

 Din psihologia poporului român - Bucharest, 1907 (republished in Editura Albatros, 1996 )

References

 Istoria Transilvaniei, Vol.2, Editura Gh. Bariţiu, Cluj, 1997
 Sociologia - ca disciplina de studiu, institutie si profesie 
 Potra, George G. - Reacţii necunoscute la demiterea lui Titulescu 29 August 1936: O "mazilire perfidă" - Magazin Istoric, 1998, Nr. 6

Romanian diplomats
Romanian philosophers
Romanian sociologists
Romanian writers
People from Vâlcea County
Suicides in Romania
1875 births
1945 deaths
Romanian politicians who committed suicide
1945 suicides